Vice Admiral Sir Arthur Mackenzie Power KCB MBE (18 June 1921 – 17 November 1984) was a Royal Navy officer who became Flag Officer, Plymouth.

Naval career
Born the son of Admiral of the Fleet Sir Arthur Power, Power joined the Royal Navy in 1938 and served in World War II. He was appointed Commander of the 23rd Escort Squadron in 1963, Captain of the Gunnery School (HMS Excellent) in 1964. In 1965 he commanded the detachment of seamen (who were from HMS Excellent) who manned the Royal Navy State Funeral Gun Carriage which carried the coffin at Winston Churchill's funeral. In 1968 he became Admiral Superintendent, Portsmouth. He went on to be Flag Officer, First Flotilla in 1971 and Flag Officer, Plymouth and Admiral Superintendent, Devonport in 1973 before retiring in 1975.

Family
In 1949 he married Marcia Helen Gell; they had two sons and one daughter.

References

1921 births
1984 deaths
Royal Navy vice admirals
Knights Commander of the Order of the Bath
Members of the Order of the British Empire
Royal Navy officers of World War II